The Burnside Civic Centre houses the council chambers, community centre, library and ballroom of the City of Burnside, Adelaide, South Australia. It is located at the corner of Greenhill and Portrush Roads in Tusmore. It is opposite the shopping complex, Burnside Village.

Buildings and structures in Adelaide
Town halls in South Australia